The Central District of Sabzevar County is a district (bakhsh) in Sabzevar County, Razavi Khorasan Province, Iran. At the 2006 census, its population was 233,744, in 64,532 families.  The District has one city: Sabzevar.  The District has four rural districts (dehestan): Karrab Rural District, Qasabeh-ye Gharbi Rural District, Qasabeh-ye Sharqi Rural District, and Robat Rural District.

References 

Districts of Razavi Khorasan Province
Sabzevar County